Holy Cross Roman Catholic Church is a historic Roman Catholic church complex located within the Archdiocese of Baltimore in the Federal Hill neighborhood of Baltimore, Maryland, United States.

Description
The complex consists of a group of four brick buildings: an 1860 Gothic Revival church (remodeled in 1885 and 1907), an 1871 Italianate rectory-convent, a 1903 Romanesque Revival school, and a 1928 Tudor Revival rectory.  The church has a cruciform plan and features a 200-foot steeple composed of a 125-foot tower and a 75-foot copper-clad spire. A shallow choir loft contains the 1886 organ with its stenciled pipes.  The Archdiocese listed the church as a German parish until 1959.

Holy Cross Roman Catholic Church was listed on the National Register of Historic Places in 2002.

Joseph Maskell was assigned to Holy Cross from 1982 to 1992.

Gallery

References

External links
, including undated photo, at Maryland Historical Trust
Roman Catholic Archdiocese of Baltimore

Federal Hill, Baltimore
German-American culture in Baltimore
Roman Catholic churches in Baltimore
Properties of religious function on the National Register of Historic Places in Baltimore
Roman Catholic churches completed in 1860
19th-century Roman Catholic church buildings in the United States
Gothic Revival church buildings in Maryland
Italianate architecture in Maryland
Churches on the National Register of Historic Places in Maryland
Italianate church buildings in the United States